U.S.S.R. The Art of Listening is a 2002 studio album by DJ Vadim, released on Ninja Tune.

Critical reception
Noel Dix of Exclaim! said, "With varied MCs taking the mic, Vadim is allowed to switch up his beats to accommodate their flows and the end result is quite stunning at times."

Will Sansom of BBC Music described it as "a composition of the world's more diverse and eclectic sounds, resulting in a musical canvas that stretches the imagination." Noah Zimmerman of Dusted Magazine said, "It sounds like a combination between another Ninja Tune compilation and your buddy's mixtape, with much better production value."

Track listing

References

External links
 

DJ Vadim albums
2002 albums